U.S. Post Office and Courthouse, or variations such as Federal Courthouse and Post Office or prefixed by Old, may refer to:

U.S. Courthouse and Post Office (Huntsville, Alabama), listed on the National Register of Historic Places (NRHP)
Frank M. Johnson Jr. Federal Building and United States Courthouse, Montgomery, Alabama, NRHP-listed and also known as United States Post Office and Courthouse
Sitka U.S. Post Office and Court House, in Sitka, Alaska, NRHP-listed in the Alaska panhandle
Cordova Post Office and Courthouse, in Cordova, Alaska, NRHP-listed
United States Post Office and Courthouse–Globe Main, Globe, Arizona, NRHP-listed, in Gila County
U.S. Post Office and Courthouse–Prescott Main, Prescott, Arizona, NRHP-listed, in Yavapai County
James A. Walsh United States Courthouse, Tucson, Arizona, NRHP-listed as U.S. Post Office and Courthouse, in Pima County
Fort Smith U.S. Post Office and Courthouse, Fort Smith, Arkansas, NRHP-listed
Little Rock U.S. Post Office and Courthouse, Little Rock, Arkansas, NRHP-listed
Texarkana United States Post Office and Courthouse, Texarkana, Arkansas, NRHP-listed
U.S. Post Office and Courthouse (Eureka, California), NRHP-listed
U.S. Post Office, Courthouse and Federal Building (Sacramento, California), NRHP-listed
U.S. Post Office and Courthouse (San Francisco, California), NRHP-listed
U.S. Post Office and Courthouse (Miami, Florida), NRHP-listed
Old U.S. Post Office and Courthouse (Miami, Florida), NRHP-listed
U.S. Post Office and Courthouse (Albany, Georgia), NRHP-listed
Elbert P. Tuttle U.S. Court of Appeals Building, Atlanta, Georgia, also known as U.S. Post Office and Courthouse, NRHP-listed
United States Post Office and Courthouse (Augusta, Georgia), NRHP-listed
U.S. Post Office and Courthouse (Columbus, Georgia), NRHP-listed
U.S. Post Office and Courthouse (Rome, Georgia), NRHP-listed
U.S. Post Office and Courthouse (Waycross, Georgia), NRHP-listed
Moscow Post Office and Courthouse, in Moscow, Idaho, NRHP-listed
United States Post Office and Courthouse (East St. Louis, Illinois), NRHP-listed
U.S. Post Office and Courthouse (Peoria, Illinois), NRHP-listed
U.S. Post Office and Courthouse (Quincy, Illinois), NRHP-listed
U.S. Post Office and Courthouse (Fort Wayne, Indiana), NRHP-listed
U.S. Courthouse and Post Office (Indianapolis, Indiana), NRHP-listed
United States Post Office and Court House (Davenport, Iowa), NRHP-listed
U.S. Post Office and Courthouse (Keokuk, Iowa), NRHP-listed
United States Post Office and Courthouse (Sioux City, Iowa), NRHP-listed
United States Post Office and Court House (Topeka, Kansas), NRHP-listed
Old United States Courthouse and Post Office (Frankfort, Kentucky), NRHP-listed
United States Post Office and Court House (Lexington, Kentucky), NRHP-listed
U.S. Post Office and Courthouse–Alexandria, Alexandria, Louisiana, NRHP-listed
U.S. Post Office and Courthouse–Baton Rouge, Baton Rouge, Louisiana, NRHP-listed
U.S. Post Office and Courthouse (Shreveport, Louisiana), NRHP-listed
United States Post Office and Courthouse (Baltimore, Maryland), NRHP-listed
Harold D. Donohue Federal Building and United States Courthouse, listed on the NRHP in Worcester County, Massachusetts
U.S. Post Office and Courthouse (Fergus Falls, Minnesota), NRHP-listed
Federal Courthouse and Post Office (Mankato, Minnesota), NRHP-listed
Federal Courthouse and Post Office (Moorhead, Minnesota), NRHP-listed
U.S. Courthouse and Post Office (Aberdeen, Mississippi), NRHP-listed
U.S. Post Office, Courthouse, and Customhouse (Biloxi, Mississippi), NRHP-listed
United States Post Office and Courthouse (Meridian, Mississippi), NRHP-listed
United States Courthouse and Post Office (Kansas City, Missouri), NRHP-listed
U.S. Post Office and Courthouse–Billings, Billings, Montana, NRHP-listed
U.S. Post Office and Courthouse–Glasgow Main, Glasgow, Montana, NRHP-listed
U.S. Post Office and Courthouse–Great Falls, Great Falls, Montana, NRHP-listed
U.S. Post Office and Courthouse–Havre Main, Havre, Montana, NRHP-listed
Grand Island United States Post Office and Courthouse, in Grand Island, Nebraska, NRHP-listed
United States Post Office and Courthouse (Norfolk, Nebraska), NRHP-listed
United States Post Office and Courthouse (Camden, New Jersey)
United States Courthouse and Post Office (Trenton, New Jersey)
Las Vegas Post Office and Courthouse, Las Vegas, Nevada, NRHP-listed
U.S. Post Office and Courthouse–Littleton Main, Littleton, New Hampshire, NRHP-listed
U.S. Post Office and Courthouse (Binghamton, New York), listed on the NRHP in Broome County
United States Post Office and Courthouse (Guilford, North Carolina), NRHP-listed
United States Post Office and Courthouse (New Bern, North Carolina, 1935), a contributing property
U.S. Post Office and County Courthouse (Statesville, North Carolina), NRHP-listed
United States Post Office and Courthouse (Bismarck, North Dakota), NRHP-listed
United States Post Office and Courthouse (Devils Lake, North Dakota), NRHP-listed
United States Post Office and Courthouse (Grand Forks, North Dakota), NRHP-listed
United States Post Office and Courthouse (Columbus, Ohio), NRHP-listed
United States Post Office and Courthouse (Muskogee, Oklahoma), NRHP-listed
Post Office, Courthouse, and Federal Office Building (Oklahoma City, Oklahoma), NRHP-listed
United States Post Office and Courthouse (Tulsa, Oklahoma), NRHP-listed
Woodward Federal Courthouse and Post Office, Woodward, Oklahoma, NRHP-listed
United States Post Office and Courthouse (Medford, Oregon), NRHP-listed
United States Post Office and Courthouse (Pendleton, Oregon), NRHP-listed
Erie Federal Courthouse and Post Office, in Erie, Pennsylvania, NRHP-listed
United States Post Office and Courthouse (Pittsburgh, Pennsylvania), NRHP-listed
Miguel Angel García Méndez Post Office Building, Mayaguez, Puerto Rico, NRHP-listed as "U.S. Post Office and Courthouse"
Jose V. Toledo Federal Building and United States Courthouse, San Juan, Puerto Rico, NRHP-listed as "U.S. Post Office and Courthouse"
U.S. Post Office and Courthouse (Charleston, South Carolina), NRHP-listed
Old Greenville City Hall, Greenville, South Carolina, also known as United States Post Office and Courthouse, formerly NRHP-listed
U.S. Post Office and Courthouse (Rock Hill, South Carolina), NRHP-listed
U.S. Post Office and Courthouse–Aberdeen, in Aberdeen, South Dakota, NRHP-listed
United States Post Office and Courthouse (Knoxville, Tennessee), in Knoxville, Tennessee, NRHP-listed
Amarillo U.S. Post Office and Courthouse, in Amarillo, Texas, NRHP-listed
Old U.S. Post Office and Courts Building (Jefferson, Texas), in Jefferson, Texas, NRHP-listed
San Antonio U.S. Post Office and Courthouse, in San Antonio, Texas, NRHP-listed
Sherman U.S. Post Office and Courthouse, in Sherman, Texas, NRHP-listed
Tyler U.S. Post Office and Courthouse, in Tyler, Texas, NRHP-listed
U.S. Post Office and Courthouse (Ogden, Utah), NRHP-listed
U.S. Post Office and Courthouse (Big Stone Gap, Virginia), NRHP-listed
U.S. Post Office and Courthouse (Norfolk, Virginia), NRHP-listed
Lewis F. Powell, Jr., United States Courthouse, listed on the NRHP in Richmond, Virginia, as "U.S. Post Office and Customhouse"
U.S. Post Office and Courthouse (Bellingham, Washington), NRHP-listed
U.S. Post Office and Courthouse (Yakima, Washington), NRHP-listed
United States Post Office and Court House (Huntington, West Virginia), NRHP-listed
U.S. Post Office and Courthouse (Eau Claire, Wisconsin), NRHP-listed
U.S. Post Office and Courthouse (Lander, Wyoming), NRHP-listed

See also
List of United States post offices